Wellington Country was a former parliamentary electorate in the Wellington Region from 1853 to 1860 and then 1871 to 1881. The seat covered Miramar, Mākara, Porirua, the Kapiti Coast and the Horowhenua District.

History

William Barnard Rhodes was the first representative of Wellington Country. He served until the dissolution of Parliament in 1855 and (unsuccessfully) contested the  electorate instead. The  was won by Dudley Ward, who resigned in 1858. The ensuing  was won by Alfred Brandon, who served until the dissolution of Parliament in 1860.

From 1860 to 1870, Wellington Country was replaced by the Porirua electorate, held by Brandon. Brandon was challenged by Edward Thomas Gillon. Whilst there was criticism of Brandon not having had a good connection to his electorate, Brandon won with a solid majority. The next election in 1875 was contested by Gillon, Brandon, and J. H. Wallace. Brandon was again successful and received 208 votes versus 141 for Gillon, with Wallace a distant last.

From 1911 to 1919 the geographic area was combined with Wellington Suburbs into Wellington Suburbs and Country.

Members
The electorate was represented by three Members of Parliament.

Key

Election results

1858 by-election

Notes

References

Bibliography

Historical electorates of New Zealand
Politics of the Wellington Region
1853 establishments in New Zealand
1881 disestablishments in New Zealand